Portillo, Valladolid is a municipality in Valladolid, Spain. In 2001 it had 2,574 inhabitants.

Description

Portillo was the birthplace of Pio del Rio-Hortega who first identified Microglia.

See also
Cuisine of the province of Valladolid

References

Municipalities in the Province of Valladolid